Margaret Saunders or Mrs Saunders (born 1686 - c. 1748) was a British actress.

Life
Saunders was born in Weymouth and attended a boarding school in Wiltshire before being apprenticed by a milliner. At the age of sixteen she began her acting career at Drury Lane Theatre due to an introduction by her lifelong friend Anne Oldfield.

In 1708 and 1709 she was billed "Mrs Saunders" for her performances at Drury Lane. but it appears that she never married as she was declared a spinster when she died.
Saunders appeared in many significant roles. Her comedy appearances were celebrated at a benefit performance in 1747 at the Theatre Royal. Saunders did not appear as she had been unable to leave her house for a year and a half.

Selected roles
 Wishwell in The Double Gallant by Colley Cibber (1707)
 Mrs Flimsy in The Fine Lady's Airs by Thomas Baker (1708)
 Patch in The Busie Body by Susanna Centlivre (1709)
 Dorothy in The Man's Bewitched by Susanna Centlivre (1709)
 Buisy in The Apparition by Anonymous (1713)
 Abigail in The Drummer by Joseph Addison (1716)
 Prudentia in The Play is the Plot by John Durant Breval (1718)

References

1686 births
People from Weymouth, Dorset
British actresses
1748 deaths
18th-century British actresses
18th-century English actresses